Captain Iolo Aneurin Williams (18 June 1890 – 18 January 1962), was a British writer, journalist and Liberal Party politician. His son was the composer Edward Williams.

Background
Williams was born in Middlesbrough, the son of Aneurin Williams, who was a Liberal member of parliament. He was the brother of Ursula Williams who was also a Liberal politician. He was educated at Rugby School and King's College, Cambridge. In 1920 he married Francion Elinor Dixon. They had one son and two daughters.

Professional career
Williams was Bibliographical Correspondent of the London Mercury from 1920–1939. He made contributions to the Dictionary of National Biography and the Cambridge Bibliography of English Literature. He was a published poet and writer.

Publications
Poems, 1915
New Poems, 1919
Byways Round Helicon, 1922
Shorter Poems of the 18th Century, 1923
Seven 18th Century Bibliographies, 1924
Editor: plays of Sheridan, 1926
Elements of Book-Collecting, 1927
Poetry To-day, 1927
Where the Bee Sucks, 1929 (illustrated by Katharine Cameron)
The Firm of Cadbury, 1931
Points in 18th Century Verse, 1934
English Folk Song and Dance, 1935
Flowers of Marsh and Stream (King Penguin), 1946
Early English Water-Colours, 1952

Political career
Williams was Liberal candidate for the Chelsea division of London at the 1924 General Election. Chelsea was a safe Unionist seat, so he was not expected to win. 1924 was not a good election for the Liberals and he came in third place in the race. Despite this, he contested Chelsea again at the 1929 General Election, a better election for the Liberals. He increased the Liberal share of the vote, but still finished third. He did not stand for parliament again.

Electoral record

See also
Katharine Cameron
Arthur St John Adcock

References

1890 births
1962 deaths
Liberal Party (UK) parliamentary candidates
People educated at Rugby School
Alumni of King's College, Cambridge
20th-century English poets